Florestina tripteris, the sticky florestina, is a North American species of flowering plants in the sunflower family. It is found in Mexico (from Chihuahua and Nuevo León as far south as Guerrero) and in the south-central United States (Texas).

Florestina tripteris is a perennial herb up to 60 cm (2 feet) tall. One plant produces many flower heads in a branching array. Each head contains as many as 30 white disc flowers but no ray flowers. The species grows in open, sunlit locations.

References 

Bahieae
Flora of Mexico
Flora of Texas
Plants described in 1836